Side. also known as Sibde (Σίβδη), was a town of ancient Caria. According to Pliny the Elder, Alexander the Great united in Halicarnassus six cities by synoecism, including Side, next to Theangela, Medmasa, Uranium, Pedasa and Telmissus. Strabo, however, points out that this synoecism would have been carried out earlier, during the reign of Mausolus. 

Its site is tentatively located near Alazeytin, Turkey.

References

Populated places in ancient Caria
Former populated places in Turkey